Ivan Sergeyevich Zvyagin (born 17 September 1991) is a former Russian football midfielder.

Club career
He made his debut in the Russian Second Division for FC Dolgoprudny on 20 April 2013 in a game against FC Karelia Petrozavodsk.

He made his Russian Football National League debut for FC Khimik Dzerzhinsk on 6 July 2014 in a game against PFC Krylia Sovetov Samara.

References

External links
 
 
 Career summary by sportbox.ru

1991 births
Living people
Russian footballers
Association football midfielders
FC Khimik Dzerzhinsk players
FC Solyaris Moscow players
FC Olimp-Dolgoprudny players